Neela Vaswani is an American writer of Indian extraction. She was born on the 11th September 1974 in Port Jefferson, New York.
She narrated the audio version of I am Malala and won Grammy for this in 2015. She lives in New York City. She is the founder of Storylines Project that she did with the New York Public Library.

Books 

 Same Sun Here, co-authored with Silas House.
Where the Long Grass Bends
This is my Eye
You Have Given Me a Country

Reviews about her work 
Deborah Stevenson who is editor for Bulletin of the Center for Children's Books  at Johns Hopkins University Press wrote in her review that "While a few spreads digress less usefully, albeit playfully, it's that emphasis on varying perspectives that makes this valuable, since kids in all kinds of places will benefit from the prompt to reexamine their surroundings through fresh eyes."

Maryn Wheeler who work at Brigham Young University wrote "Vaswani easily captures the intricacy of perspectives in this vivid yet simple picture book. The first-person point of view draws the reader in and challenges them to see what she sees."

Kirkus Reviews said, "While readers may be prompted to wonder how a photo series taken by an actual child photographer might have differed, Vaswani’s debut picture book is an elegant and playful look at perspective, photography, and a familiar (to many) cityscape."

References 

21st-century American women writers
1974 births
Living people